Graptolita may be a misspelling for:
 Graptolithina, or graptolites, a widely preserved group of fossil animals
 Graptolitha, a genus of moths